Rockers is a two-disc compilation album by the British rock band Slade, released by Salvo in April 2007. It contains thirty-seven tracks spanning the band's career from 1969 to 1987 and is described as a collection of the band's "hardest-hitting tracks".

Track listing

Disc one

Disc two

Critical reception

David Randall of the webzine Get Ready to Rock! wrote: "Rockers does exactly what it says on the tin and well annotated notes guide us through the band's growth. If short on subtlety, Rockers does flag up an excellent reissue series which reiterates Slade as one of our most colourful if under-estimated rock bands."

Personnel
Slade
Noddy Holder – lead vocals, rhythm guitar
Dave Hill – lead guitar, backing vocals
Jim Lea – bass, piano, violin, keyboard, guitar, backing vocals
Don Powell – drums

Production
Chas Chandler - tracks 2-19 (Disc One)
John Punter - tracks 12, 16 (Disc Two)
Slade - tracks 1 (Disc One), 1-9 (Disc Two)
Roger Wake - tracks 1 (Disc One)
Jim Lea - tracks 10-11, 13-15, 17-18 (Disc Two)

Other
Tim Turan - remastering
Chris Ingham - liner notes

References

2007 compilation albums
Slade compilation albums